Tres was a comune (municipality) in Trentino in the northern Italian region Trentino-Alto Adige/Südtirol, located about  north of Trento. It was merged with Coredo, Smarano, Taio and Vervò on January 1, 2015, to form a new municipality, Predaia.

Tres borders the following municipalities: Coredo, Smarano, Sfruz, Taio, Cortaccia sulla strada del vino and Vervò.

Demographic evolution

References

Cities and towns in Trentino-Alto Adige/Südtirol
Nonsberg Group